Rust Airstrip  is a privately owned, public use airport located two nautical miles (4 km) south of the central business district of Woolsey, in Fayette County, Georgia, United States.

Facilities and aircraft 
Rust Airstrip covers an area of 10 acres (4 ha) at an elevation of 810 feet (247 m) above mean sea level. It has one runway designated E/W with a turf surface measuring 2,750 by 120 feet (838 x 37 m).

For the 12-month period ending January 12, 2000, the airport had 500 general aviation aircraft operations, an average of 41 per month. At that time there were three aircraft based at this airport, all single-engine.

References

External links 
 Aerial image as of January 1993 from USGS The National Map
 

Airports in Georgia (U.S. state)
Transportation in Fayette County, Georgia